Empire Airlines is a passenger and cargo airline based in Hayden, Idaho, near Coeur d'Alene. It operates over 120 scheduled cargo flights a day in 18 US states and Canada. Empire also started passenger service within Hawaii, under the name "Ohana by Hawaiian", which was run from 2014-2021. Its main base is Coeur d'Alene Airport with a hub at Spokane International Airport.  The company slogan is We Can Do That.

History 
Empire Airlines was established and started operations in May 1977 in Orofino as a charter company. Originally named Clearwater Flying Service (thus the CFS identifier for its flights), it was purchased by Nick Chenoweth and Vick Walters on April 12. Soon thereafter, a third partner, Mel Spelde joined as a flight instructor. Clearwater Flying Service made a living doing several different things including, fire patrol, transporting outfitters into the backcountry, air ambulance, air pollution monitoring, charters and flight instruction.

On November 1, 1980, Empire Airlines purchased West Aire, Inc. at Coeur d'Alene and expanded business to include aircraft sales and maintenance. In 1981 Empire purchased Executive Aviation in Missoula, Montana, and leased Twin Otter aircraft for United States Forest Service smoke jumping contracts. In December 1983 and January 1984, Empire was awarded government contracts to transport people and materiel in Grenada, following the conflict. In the mid-1980s, Empire received contracts from several places including, a Colorado ski destination, Hughes Aircraft, and Naval Arctic Research Laboratory. In 1988 Empire signed a FedEx Express contract to fly and maintain Cessna 208 Caravan aircraft out of Portland and Spokane; Seattle was added in September. In 1989 Empire became a FAR 121 operator after the purchase of Pacific Alaska Airlines and two Fairchild F-27 aircraft. In August Empire started F27 services for FedEx Express.

In 1990, Empire added more cargo routes and performed its first heavy maintenance check on a Fairchild F-27. By 1992, the airline was operating British Aerospace BAe 146-200 jet aircraft on contract charter flights for Silverwing Holidays from Bellingham, WA and Spokane to Los Angeles, Palm Springs, Phoenix and Reno.  In 1993, Empire became a sustaining member of CASE (Coordinating Agency for Supplier Evaluation). From October 1993 to May 1994, it operated Fokker F27-500 aircraft in Hawaii on behalf of Mahalo Air, while the latter airline was awaiting its own operating certificate. In 1995, Empire moved corporate offices and ended passenger services, focusing on cargo, maintenance and airline startups. Empire began sending technical reps to Conair during heavy maintenance checks on Fokker F27 Friendships. In 1998, Empire started flying and maintaining Short 360 aircraft. Empire entered into a partnership agreement to begin Express Air serving FedEx in Europe.

In 2001, Empire received a Repair Station certificate. In 2002, Empire purchased Reliant Logistics as a wholly owned subsidiary. In 2003, The first ATR 42 aircraft arrived in Spokane for cargo conversion. In 2004, the first ATR 42 put on Empire's certificate made the first ATR FedEx Feeder revenue flight.  In 2005, Empire moved into new hangar and office building, in Hayden, Idaho, adjacent to the Coeur d'Alene airport (COE).  In 2013, Empire Airlines began drone flights under the name "Empire Unmanned", mainly serving agriculture and mining industries in the Western U.S.

On December 31, 2021, Empire Airlines acquired fellow FedEx feeder West Air, expanding its footprint to include all of California.

'Ohana by Hawaiian service 
In December 2012, it was announced that Empire would begin operating three ATR 42-500 series propjet aircraft acquired by Hawaiian Airlines on routes within the state of Hawaii. 'Ohana by Hawaiian launched initial service to Molokai Airport (MKK) on March 11, 2014, and Lana'i Airport on March 18, 2014. 

In 2015, Hawaiian Airlines announced a new all-cargo freighter service to be operated by Empire with ATR 72 turboprop aircraft on interisland routes in Hawaii

Hawaiian Airlines suspended all 'Ohana by Hawaiian service on January 14, 2021.

Previous passenger service 

Empire operated scheduled passenger flights during the early 1990s in the Pacific Northwest with Fairchild F-27 and Fairchild Swearingen Metroliner "Metro II" turboprop aircraft.  In 1993, the airline was serving Boise, ID (BOI), Coeur d'Alene, ID (COE), Lewiston, ID (LWS), Olympia, WA (OLM) and Spokane, WA (GEG).  Empire previously served Seattle (SEA) as well,
Initial scheduled service was between Boise and Coeur d'Alene, ID utilizing Cessna 441 Conquest II turboprop  aircraft. Lewiston, ID was added as an enroute stop later, then the Swearingen Metro II came along. 
In May 1993, cities served were Boise, Lewiston, Coeur d'Alene, ID; Portland and Astoria, OR; Spokane, Pasco, Olympia, Seattle, and Hoquiam, WA. This was the third time Seattle has been served. Prior to the Metro propjets being introduced and new service to Lewiston, Empire had served Seattle and Missoula with the Cessna Conquest turboprop from Coeur d'Alene.

Fleet 
As of January 2022, the Empire Airlines fleet includes the following aircraft:

Previously operated 
Empire Air formerly operated the following aircraft:

 British Aerospace BAe 146-200 - only jet aircraft type operated by the airline
 Cessna 441 Conquest II
 de Havilland Canada DHC-6 Twin Otter
 Fairchild F-27
 Fairchild Swearingen Metroliner "Metro II"
 Fokker F27 Friendship (series -500 and -600 aircraft operated for FedEx in cargo operations and series -500 aircraft for Mahalo Air in scheduled passenger operations)
 Short 360

Accidents and incidents
 January 11, 1995: A  Cessna 208 Caravan leased by FedEx Express and flying a cargo flight from Flagstaff to Phoenix Sky Harbor International Airport crashed about 1.3 miles SSE of Flagstaff Pulliam Airport. While returning to the airport, the "fuel selector off" warning horn was heard. The pilot was killed. The cause of the crash was determined to be the pilot's failure to properly configure the fuel system prior to takeoff.
 October 9, 2000: Flight 665, a Cessna 208 Caravan on a VFR cargo flight from Bellingham to Orcas Island crashed on Lummi Island. The pilot onboard was killed. The cause of the crash was determined to be the pilot flying into adverse weather and not maintaining proper terrain clearance.

 December 24, 2005:  An Empire Airlines Cessna 208B Caravan on a VFR cargo flight from Portland, Oregon to Roseburg, Oregon crashed shortly after takeoff in a golf course south of the Portland International Airport at 7:43 AM PT.  The cause of the crash was determined to be a partial loss of engine power for an undetermined reason during the initial takeoff climb resulting in an in-flight collision with objects.
 On 27 January 2009, Flight 8284, an ATR-42-320 cargo plane under contract from FedEx Express crashed on landing at Lubbock Preston Smith International Airport at 04:37 CT.  The plane, which had been traveling from Fort Worth Alliance Airport, landed short of the touchdown zone and skidded off the runway amid light freezing rain. There was a small fire on the plane and two crew members were taken to the hospital with minor injuries.

References

External links
Empire Airlines

Regional Airline Association members
Cargo airlines of the United States
Airlines based in Idaho
Coeur d'Alene, Idaho
Regional airlines of the United States
American companies established in 1977
1977 establishments in Idaho
Airlines established in 1977
Articles containing video clips
Hawaiian Airlines